Edward A. Flood is an American politician who is the member-elect for New York's 4th assembly district. A Republican, he is a resident of Port Jefferson Station, New York. He was first elected in 2022, defeating 30-year incumbent Steve Englebright in a close race.

Following his victory, Flood praised Englebright for having a clean ethical record, and stated that he wanted to continue Englebright's focus on environmental issues.

References 

Living people
Republican Party members of the New York State Assembly
21st-century American politicians
Year of birth missing (living people)